Roseivirga seohaensis is a Gram-negative, non-motile, non-spore-forming and rod-shaped bacterium from the genus of Roseivirga which has been isolated from sea water from the Yellow Sea in Korea.

References

Cytophagia
Bacteria described in 2005